The 2012 South American Rhythmic Gymnastics Championships were held in Cali, Colombia, September 20–23, 2012. The competition was organized by the Colombian Gymnastics Federation and approved by the International Gymnastics Federation.

Medalists

References 

2012 in gymnastics
Rhythmic Gymnastics,2012
International gymnastics competitions hosted by Colombia
2012 in Colombian sport